"Fish Scale" is a song by American rapper YoungBoy Never Broke Again, released on January 5, 2022 as a promotional single from his mixtape Colors (2022). It was produced by Jason "Cheese" Goldberg, Otxhello and Ambezza.

Composition
Jon Powell of Revolt wrote that the song sees YoungBoy "keeping it very street-oriented on wax". Both the production and lyrics of the song have been described as "sinister"; music critics noted the lyrics, "Spotted him, I sent a pic to that nigga to show him I'm only lettin' him breathe / Shot at him, I swung that stick at that nigga / The bullets, they stronger than Hercules".

Music video
An accompanying music video was released on January 5, 2022. It finds YoungBoy rapping around his house, from the garage to his home studio "with different chains and wardrobe changes".

Charts

References

2022 singles
2022 songs
YoungBoy Never Broke Again songs
Songs written by YoungBoy Never Broke Again
Atlantic Records singles